Roger Kenworthy (born 14 January 1971) is an Australian former professional rugby league footballer who played in the 1980s and 1990s.

Playing career
Kenworthy made his début for Wakefield Trinity during February 1997, he played his last match for Wakefield Trinity during the 1998 season.

First Division Grand Final appearances
Roger Kenworthy played  in Wakefield Trinity's 24-22 victory over Featherstone Rovers in the 1998 First Division Grand Final at McAlpine Stadium, Huddersfield on 26 September 1998.

References

External links
Statistics at rugbyleagueproject.org

Australian rugby league players
Canberra Raiders players
Living people
Place of birth missing (living people)
Rugby league fullbacks
Rugby league halfbacks
Rugby league wingers
Wakefield Trinity players
1971 births